A partial lunar eclipse took place on Tuesday, January 30, 1934.

Visibility

Related lunar eclipses

See also
List of lunar eclipses
List of 20th-century lunar eclipses

Notes

External links

1934-01
1934 in science